Ivory Coast competed at the 1988 Summer Olympics in Seoul, South Korea.

Competitors
The following is the list of number of competitors in the Games.

Results by event

Athletics

Men's 4x400 Relay
 Akissi Kpidi, Zongo Kuya, Lancine Fofana, and Gabriel Tiacoh 
 Heat — 3:07.40
 Akissi Kpidi, René Djedjemel, Kouadio Djetnan, and Gabriel Tiacoh 
 Semi Final — 3:07.15 (→ did not advance)

Handball

Women's tournament

 Adjoua N'Dri
 Alimata Douamba
 Brigitte Guigui
 Clementine Blé
 Dounbia Bah
 Elisabeth Kouassi
 Emilie Djoman
 Gouna Irie
 Hortense Konan
 Julienne Vodoungbo
 Koko Elleingand
 Mahoula Kramou
 Wandou Guehi
 Zomou Awa

Tennis
Clément N'Goran

References

External links
 

Nations at the 1988 Summer Olympics
1988
Oly